The 2021 TK Sparta Prague Open was a professional tennis tournament played on clay courts. It was part of the 2021 ATP Challenger Tour. It took place in Prague, Czech Republic between 9 and 15 August 2021.

Singles main-draw entrants

Seeds 

 1 Rankings as of 2 August 2021.

Other entrants 
The following players received wildcards into the singles main draw:
  Toby Kodat
  Martin Krumich
  Dalibor Svrčina

The following player received entry into the singles main draw using a protected ranking:
  Gerald Melzer

The following players received entry from the qualifying draw:
  Franco Agamenone
  Adrian Andreev
  Geoffrey Blancaneaux
  Emilio Nava

Champions

Singles 

  Dalibor Svrčina def.  Dmitry Popko 6–0, 7–5.

Doubles 

  Jonáš Forejtek /  Michael Vrbenský def.  Evgeny Karlovskiy /  Evgenii Tiurnev 6–1, 6–4.

References

2021 ATP Challenger Tour
2021 in Czech tennis
August 2021 sports events in the Czech Republic